Vermont is a state in the New England region of the northeastern United States.

Vermont also may refer to:

Places

United States
Vermont Republic, name later given to the government of Vermont from 1777 until admission as a state in 1791
Vermont Township, Fulton County, Illinois
Vermont, Illinois, a village
Vermont, Indiana, an unincorporated community
Vermont, Wisconsin, a town
Vermont (community), Wisconsin, an unincorporated community
Lake Vermont, a temporary lake in North America created at the close of the last ice age

Elsewhere
Le Vermont, a commune in France
Vermont, Victoria, a suburb of the Australian city of Melbourne
Vermont, Western Cape, a town in South Africa
Vermont, Saint Vincent and the Grenadines, a village

Transportation
Vermont (automobile), the first automobile to make a trip across North America  
Vermont, a ferry used by the Lake Champlain Transportation Company
Vermont, the first steamboat on Lake Champlain, launched in 1808
Vermont Railway, a major railroad carrier in Vermont
Vermont Avenue, Los Angeles, California
Vermont Street (San Francisco), California
Vermont, a street in Sunderland, United Kingdom

People
Vermont Garrison (1915–1994), US Air Force officer and flying ace
Vermont Hatch (1893–1959), American lawyer
Vermont C. Royster (1914–1996), American journalist
Nicolae Vermont (1866–1932), Romanian painter
Pierre Vermont (–1533), French composer

Other uses
University of Vermont, Burlington, Vermont, United States
Vermont Catamounts, the athletic program of the University of Vermont
, several US Navy ships
Vermont Building, Boston, Massachusetts, United States
Vermont (band), an indie band composed of former members of The Promise Ring

See also

Hyacinthe Collin de Vermont (1693–1761), a French painter
Vermonter (train), a daily Amtrak passenger train operating between St. Albans, Vermont and Washington, DC
Verdmont, a historic house in Bermuda